The men's shot put event at the 2013 Summer Universiade was held on 7 July.

Medalists

Results

Qualification
Qualification: 19.00 m (Q) or at least 12 best (q) qualified for the final.

Final

References 

Shot Put
2013